The Pacific Ocean theater of World War II was a major theater of the Pacific War, the war between the Allies and the Empire of Japan.  It was defined by the Allied powers' Pacific Ocean Area command, which included most of the Pacific Ocean and its islands, while mainland Asia was excluded, as were the Philippines, the Dutch East Indies, Borneo, Australia, most of the Territory of New Guinea, and the western part of the Solomon Islands.

It officially came into existence on March 30, 1942, when US Admiral Chester Nimitz was appointed Supreme Allied Commander Pacific Ocean Areas.  In the other major theater in the Pacific region, known as the South West Pacific theatre, Allied forces were commanded by US General Douglas MacArthur. Both Nimitz and MacArthur were overseen by the US Joint Chiefs and the Western Allies Combined Chiefs of Staff (CCoS).

The Rengō Kantai was led by Admiral Isoroku Yamamoto, until he was killed in an attack by U.S. fighter planes in April 1943. Yamamoto was succeeded by Admiral Mineichi Koga (1943–44) and Admiral Soemu Toyoda (1944–45). The  of the Imperial Japanese Army (IJA) was responsible for Imperial Japanese Army ground and air units in Southeast Asia and the South Pacific. The IJN and IJA did not formally use joint/combined staff at the operational level, and their command structures/geographical areas of operations overlapped with each other and those of the Allies.

In the Pacific Ocean theater, Japanese forces fought primarily against the United States Navy, the U.S. Army, which had 6 Corps and 21 Divisions, and the U.S. Marine Corps, which had only 6 Divisions.  The United Kingdom (British Pacific Fleet), New Zealand, Australia, Canada, and other Allied nations, also contributed forces.

Major campaigns and battles 
 Pacific Theater
 Attack on Pearl Harbor 7 December 1941
 Battle of Wake Island 7–23 December 1941
 Philippines campaign (1941–1942) 8 December 1941 – 8 May 1942
 Doolittle Raid 18 April 1942
 Battle of Midway 4–7 June 1942
 Guadalcanal campaign 7 August 1942 to 9 February 1943
 Gilbert and Marshall Islands campaign 1943–44
 Makin Island raid 17–18 August 1942
 Battle of Tarawa 20 November 1943
 Battle of Makin 20–23 November 1943
 Battle of Kwajalein 14 February 1944
 Battle of Eniwetok 17 February 1944
 Attack on Truk Island 17–18 February 1944
 Mariana and Palau Islands campaign 1944
 Battle of Saipan 15 June 1944
 Battle of the Philippine Sea 19–21 June 1944
 Battle of Guam 21 July 1944
 Battle of Tinian 24 July 1944
 Battle of Peleliu 15 September 1944
 Battle of Angaur 17 September 1944
 Battle of Leyte 17 October 1944
 Battle of Luzon 9 January 1945
 Battle of Iwo Jima 19 February 1945
 Battle of Okinawa 1 April 1945
 North Pacific Theater
 Aleutian Islands Campaign 1942–43
 Battle of the Komandorski Islands 26 March 1943

References

Bibliography 
 .
 .
 .
 .
 .
 .
 .
 .
 
 
 

 
 Pacific theater of World War II, Ocean
Theaters and campaigns of World War II
Military history of Japan during World War II
World War 2